This is a list of lakes of the Czech Republic, greater as 1 ha, sorted by area.

See also

List of dams and reservoirs in the Czech Republic
List of ponds of the Czech Republic

Czech Republic
Lakes